The 2023 All England Open (officially known as the Yonex All England Open Badminton Championships 2023 for sponsorship reasons) was a badminton tournament which took place at the Utilita Arena Birmingham in Birmingham, England, from 14 to 19 March 2023 and had a total prize pool of $1,250,000.

Tournament
The 2023 All England Open was the sixth tournament of the 2023 BWF World Tour and was part of the All England Open championships, which has been held since 1899. The tournament was organized by the Badminton England and sanction from the Badminton World Federation.

Venue
This tournament was held at the Utilita Arena Birmingham in Birmingham, England.

Point distribution
Below is the point distribution table for each phase of the tournament based on the BWF points system for the BWF World Tour Super 1000 event.

Prize pool
The total prize money for this tournament was US$990,000. The distribution of the prize money was in accordance with BWF regulations.

Men's singles

Seeds 

 Viktor Axelsen (second round)
 Jonatan Christie (first round)
 Anthony Sinisuka Ginting (quarter-finals)
 Lee Zii Jia (semi-finals)
 Chou Tien-chen (first round)
 Kunlavut Vitidsarn (second round)
 Kodai Naraoka (quarter-finals)
 Loh Kean Yew (first round)

Finals

Top half

Section 1

Section 2

Bottom half

Section 3

Section 4

Women's singles

Seeds 

 Akane Yamaguchi (semi-finals)
 An Se-young (champion)
 Tai Tzu-ying (semi-finals)
 Chen Yufei (final)
 He Bingjiao (quarter-finals)
 Wang Zhiyi (quarter-finals)
 Carolina Marin (quarter-finals)
 Ratchanok Intanon (first round)

Finals

Top half

Section 1

Section 2

Bottom half

Section 3

Section 4

Men's doubles

Seeds 

 Fajar Alfian / Muhammad Rian Ardianto (champions)
 Aaron Chia / Soh Wooi Yik (first round)
 Mohammad Ahsan / Hendra Setiawan (final)
 Takuro Hoki / Yugo Kobayashi (quarter-finals)
 Liu Yuchen / Ou Xuanyi (quarter-finals)
 Satwiksairaj Rankireddy / Chirag Shetty (second round)
 Kim Astrup / Anders Skaarup Rasmussen (second round)
 Ong Yew Sin / Teo Ee Yi (second round)

Finals

Top half

Section 1

Section 2

Bottom half

Section 3

Section 4

Women's doubles

Seeds 

 Chen Qingchen / Jia Yifan (quarter-finals)
 Nami Matsuyama / Chiharu Shida (second round)
 Zhang Shuxian / Zheng Yu (semi-finals)
 Jeong Na-eun / Kim Hye-jeong (first round)
 Pearly Tan / Thinaah Muralitharan (first round)
 Kim So-yeong / Kong Hee-yong (champions)
 Jongkolphan Kititharakul / Rawinda Prajongjai (first round)
 Apriyani Rahayu / Siti Fadia Silva Ramadhanti (quarter-finals)

Finals

Top half

Section 1

Section 2

Bottom half

Section 3

Section 4

Mixed doubles

Seeds 

 Zheng Siwei / Huang Yaqiong (champions)
 Yuta Watanabe / Arisa Higashino (second round)
 Dechapol Puavaranukroh / Sapsiree Taerattanachai (quarter-finals)
 Thom Gicquel / Delphine Delrue (second round)
 Feng Yanzhe / Huang Dongping (first round)
 Tan Kian Meng / Lai Pei Jing (second round)
 Goh Soon Huat / Lai Shevon Jemie (first round)
 Mark Lamsfuß / Isabel Lohau (first round)

Finals

Top half

Section 1

Section 2

Bottom half

Section 3

Section 4

References

External links
 Tournament link

All England Open Badminton Championships
All England Open
All England Open
All England Open